Andy Hubert (born 29 December 1990 in Bonn) is a German footballer who plays as a goalkeeper for Bonner SC II for 1. FC Saarbrücken. Hubert spent two years in the youth set up of Bayer 04 Leverkusen before joining Bonner SC in 2009. After 25 appearances in his first season, he signed for 3rd Liga side 1. FC Saarbrücken in 2010, and played in the first five matches of the 2010–11 season, owing to an injury to Enver Marina, Saarbrücken's first-choice goalkeeper. After Marina's return to action, Hubert settled into a role as second-choice 'keeper before leaving FCS in 2012 to return to Bonner SC.

References

External links
 

1990 births
Living people
Bonner SC players
1. FC Saarbrücken players
Sportspeople from Bonn
Association football goalkeepers
3. Liga players
German footballers
Footballers from North Rhine-Westphalia